The 2009 League of Ireland Premier Division was the 25th season of the League of Ireland Premier Division. The division was made up of 10 teams. Bohemians were champions while Shamrock Rovers finished as runners-up.

Teams

Overview
The 2009 Premier Division featured 10 clubs. The regular season began on 6 March and concluded on 6 November. Each team played every other team four times, totalling 36 matches. On the final day of the regular season Bohemians were crowned League of Ireland champions for the eleventh time in the club's history after drawing 1–1 with Bray Wanderers at the Carlisle Grounds. After the season ended both Derry City and Cork City were expelled from the League of Ireland. Derry City were accused of making extra payments to players using unofficial secondary contracts. This was against league rules which placed limits on the amount clubs could spend on players' wages. Cork City had been in serious financial difficulties for several seasons and its holding company was eventually wound up by the High Court. However both clubs were effectively reformed and were subsequently allowed to join the 2010 First Division.

Final table

Results

Matches 1–18

Matches 19–36

Promotion/relegation play-offs
The ninth and tenth placed teams from the Premier Division, Drogheda United and Bray Wanderers, played off after the regular season was completed. The winner would retain a place in the 2010 Premier Division. The loser would play off against the winner of the 2009 First Division play off. The winner of this match would also gain a place in the 2010 Premier Division.    
Premier Division
  
Drogheda United retain their place in the 2010 Premier Division
Premier Division v First Division

Sporting Fingal won 4–2 on aggregate and were promoted to the Premier Division. The result of the play off would eventually prove null and void. Despite losing play-off, Bray Wanderers also retained their place in the Premier Division after Cork City and Derry City were relegated.

Top goalscorers

Last updated: 6 November 2009Source: soccerway.com

See also
 2009 League of Ireland First Division
 2009 League of Ireland Cup
 2009 A Championship

Notes

References

 

 
League of Ireland Premier Division seasons
1
1
Ireland
Ireland